Metalac a.d. is a Serbian manufacturing company based in Gornji Milanovac, Serbia. With around 2,000 employees, it is one of the largest companies in Moravica District.

History
Metalac was founded in 1959 in Gornji Milanovac, SFR Yugoslavia. It soon emerged as the largest Yugoslavian kitchen utensil manufacturer. Since 21 July 1998, it has operated as a joint-stock company.

Metalac has a total of 14 subsidiary companies, of which five are manufacturing companies and ten wholesale companies in Serbia and abroad.

The governing bodies of the company are the supervisory board and the board of directors. Supervisory and management boards are appointed for a period of four years. The Supervisory Board consists of experts who are important for the company's operations, while the Executive Board consists of five executive directors. The Director General shall be appointed from the Executive Board.

Market data
As of 19 January 2018, Metalac a.d. has a market capitalization of 34.64 million euros.

Subsidiaries
There are 14 companies that operate as subsidiaries of Metalac:
 Metalac Posudje d.o.o.
 Metalac Print d.o.o.
 Metalac Bojler d.o.o.
 Metalac Inko d.o.o.
 Metalac Fad d.o.o.
 Metalac Market d.o.o.
 Metalac Trade d.o.o.
 Metalalac Proleter a.d.
 Metalac Home Market a.d.
 Metpor d.o.o.
 Metrot o.o.o. (Russia)
 Metalac o.o.o. (Ukraine)
 Metalac Home Market d.o.o. (Croatia)
 Metalac Market d.o.o. (Montenegro)

See also 
 FK Metalac Gornji Milanovac, professional football club founded by Metalac workers in 1961.

References

External links
 
 Metalac Market 

1959 establishments in Yugoslavia
Companies based in Gornji Milanovac
Manufacturing companies established in 1959
Manufacturing companies of Serbia
Serbian brands